Kareh-ye Qaleh Kohneh (also Romanized as Kareh-e Qal‘eh Kohneh; also known as Kūh Qal‘eh Sefīd) is a village in Dowlatabad Rural District, in the Central District of Ravansar County, Kermanshah Province, Iran. At the 2006 census, its population was 94, in 23 families.

References 

Populated places in Ravansar County